Khurai Angaobi (English: Khurai's Mad Lady) is a 2019 Indian Meitei language film written and directed by Sudhir Kangjam. It is produced by Jugeshori Sairem under the banner of Sairem Art Creation. The film stars Soma Laishram, Gokul Athokpam, Biju Ningombam and Hamom Sadananda in the lead roles. The movie was premiered at Bhagyachandra Open Air Theatre (BOAT) on 5 October 2019.

The movie met with piracy issues in May and June 2020. Khurai Angaobi was banned by Film Forum Manipur in 2020 following complaints that the film tried to show Khurai women in a bad light. The ban was removed after proper understanding was reached.

Synopsis
An unfortunate incident leads Nganthoi to paint in her mind a very bad image of Ningthem. The latter also judges Nganthoi giving her an obnoxious tag that have the potential to give a very wrong impression about the women of her locality in general. In due course of time, both realise that their prejudices are utterly wrong. They accept their mistakes and fall for one another. When their marriage is about to take place, Nganthoi faces another obstacle in her life. Ningthem gets to know about it and helps in solving the problem. Thaba's unrequited love for Ningthem finds solace in accepting Lanchenba's love for her.

Cast
 Soma Laishram as Nganthoi
 Gokul Athokpam as Ningthem
 Biju Ningombam as Thaba
 Hamom Sadananda as Lanchenba
 Ratan Lai as Nganthoi's brother
 Idhou as Nganthoi's father
 Thoudam Ongbi Modhubala as Nganthoi's mother
 Longjam Ongbi Lalitabi as Thaba's mother
 Surjit Saikhom as Ningthem's friend
 Avi Khundrakpam as Police
 Rajkumar Sushant

Soundtrack
Rahul Blue composed the songs for the movie. Sudhir Kangjam and Ajit Ningthouja wrote the lyrics. The songs are titled Yenglaroi Eidi and Penna Teibiro.

References

2019 films
2010s Meitei-language films